Pietrastornina is a town and comune in the province of Avellino, Campania, southern Italy.

Notable residents
Matteo Piantedosi (born 1963), Italian Minister of the Interior: born in his mother's Naples and raised in his father's Pietrastornina, where he retained a house and was made an honorary citizen

References

Cities and towns in Campania